The House at 202 Blanca Avenue is a historic home in Tampa, Florida. It is located at 202 Blanca Avenue. On August 3, 1989, it was added to the U.S. National Register of Historic Places.

House was torn down in January 2022. It is now a vacant lot.

References and external links
 Hillsborough County listings at National Register of Historic Places

Gallery

Houses in Tampa, Florida
History of Tampa, Florida
Houses on the National Register of Historic Places in Hillsborough County, Florida
Mediterranean Revival architecture of Davis Islands, Tampa, Florida
1926 establishments in Florida